The Palace of Fomento (Spanish: Palacio de Fomento), also known as the Ministry of Agriculture Building, is a nineteenth-century office building in Madrid, Spain.  Designed by Ricardo Velázquez Bosco, and built between 1893 and 1897, it is on a prominent site opposite Atocha railway station.

Use and name
The building's name has changed over the years reflecting the official name of the Ministry which occupies it. It was originally occupied by the Ministerio de Fomento (Ministry of Public Works and Transport). For most of its life the building has been the seat of the Agriculture Ministry, and the words "Ministerio de Agricultura" are prominently displayed in a cartouche on the facade.

In 2008, the Agriculture Ministry merged with the Environment Ministry. The building houses civil servants belonging to the current Ministry of Agriculture, Food and Environment (Ministerio de Agricultura, Alimentación y Medio Ambiente).

Sculptures
In 1905, a group of marble sculptures by Agustí Querol Subirats entitled La Gloria y los Pegasos was placed on top of the building. The damage suffered during the Civil War and the inclement weather suffered over time deteriorated the sculptures, which were replaced by bronze replicas in 1976.

Heritage status and access
It was put on Spain's national heritage register in 1989 under the name Ministerio de Agricultura, Pesca y Alimentación (Ministry of Agriculture, Fisheries and Food). 
It is classed as a Bien de Interés Cultural or Property of Cultural Interest.

As at 2016 guided tours are available to the public outside normal office hours.

References

Buildings and structures in Jerónimos neighborhood, Madrid
Bien de Interés Cultural landmarks in Madrid